So Wrong/You're Stronger Than Me is an EP released by American country music singer, Patsy Cline on September 24, 1962. It was the third and final EP Cline would release that year.

So Wrong/You're Stronger Than Me contained four songs, two on each side of the record that it was released on. The first two songs on side one were new: "So Wrong" and "You're Stronger Than Me." "So Wrong" was the third single Cline released in 1962, peaking at #14 on the Billboard Country Chart, and its flip side was "You're Stronger Than Me" (the re-recorded version). Because the single was not released on any album, this EP served as the source of obtaining the single and its B-side. On side two, two songs from Cline's 1962 album, Sentimentally Yours, were put on the EP: "Heartaches" and "Your Cheatin' Heart." 

This would be Cline's last EP collection that would be released in her lifetime, as she would be killed in a plane crash less than a year later in March 1963. However, several other EP's would be released following her death. The cover photo for So Wrong/You're Stronger Than Me was taken by photographer, Hal Buksbaum.

Although not released as a single, "You're Stronger Than Me" was also covered by George Strait on his 2000 album titled George Strait.

Track listing
Side 1:
"So Wrong" — (Carl Perkins, Danny Dill, Mel Tillis) 3:00
"You're Stronger Than Me" — (Hank Cochran, Jimmy Key) 2:37
1962 re-recorded version

Side 2:
"Heartaches" — (Al Hoffman, John Klenner) 2:11
"Your Cheatin' Heart" — (Hank Williams) 2:19

Personnel
All sessions were recorded at Bradley Film and Music Studios in Nashville, Tennessee, United States.

 Byron Bach — cello
 Brenton Banks — violin
 Harold Bradley — 6-string electric bass
 Cecil Brower — violin
 Howard Carpenter — viola
 Patsy Cline — lead vocals
 Floyd Cramer — piano
 Ray Edenton — rhythm guitar
 Buddy Harman — drums
 Walter Haynes — steel guitar
 Randy Hughes — acoustic guitar
 Lillian Hunt — violin
 The Jordanaires — background vocals
 Grady Martin — electric guitar
 Bob Moore — acoustic bass
 Bill Pursell — organ
 Verne Richardson — violin
 Ed Tarpley — viola
 Joe Zinkan — acoustic bass

References

Patsy Cline EPs
1962 EPs
Albums produced by Owen Bradley
Decca Records EPs